Unisex is an adjective indicating something is not sex-specific, i.e. is suitable for any type of sex. The term can also mean gender-blindness or gender neutrality.

The term 'unisex' was coined as a neologism in the 1960s and was used fairly informally. The combining prefix uni- is from Latin unus, meaning one or single. However, 'unisex' seems to have been influenced by words such as united and universal, in which uni- takes the related sense shared. Unisex then means shared by sexes.

Examples

Hair stylists and beauty salons that serve both men and women are often referred to as unisex. This is also typical of other services and products that had traditionally been separated by sexes, such as clothing shops or beauty products. Public toilets are commonly sex segregated but if that is not the case, they are referred to as unisex public toilets. Unisex clothing includes garments like T-shirts; versions of other garments may be tailored for the different fits depending on one's sex, such as jeans. The sharing of a pool or recreational facility by swimmers and others of various sexes is commonly referred to as mixed bathing. When a school admits students of various sexes, it may be called coeducational or a mixed-sex school.

See also

Mixed-sex education
Mixed bathing
Unisex name
Unisex public toilet
Gender role
Gender mainstreaming

References

Androgyny
Gender equality
Sexuality and society